Germiston High School (established September 1917
) is a South African English-medium government school based in Germiston. It is the second oldest high school in Germiston.

History

The school was established in 10 September 1917 by Mr R.C Harding. The schools first name was Secondary School Germiston which served as a unisex school till the boys and girls were separated. The school was housed temporarily in the building today occupied by Germiston South School. In April of the following year the school became known as the High School Germiston

A start was eventually made in 1922, and the building was officially opened by the Administrator of Transvaal on 1 August 1923. There was opposition to the site by many residents of Germiston who complained that it was too far out of town! Colours were selected in 1917  but there was difficulty in obtaining them because of the Great War, and for the same reason, when they were obtainable, they were not of a very good quality.

Mr R.J. Johnson became headmaster in 1919, a position he occupied until 1924, when he was succeeded by Mr F.N. Gammidge. At the beginning of the 1925 season the school game was changed from soccer to “rugger” and during the same year the cadet detachment had the honour of providing a guard of honour to H.R.H the Prince of Wales, (to later become King Edward VIII) on the occasion of his visit to Germiston.

Mr W. Main succeeded Mr Gammidge in 1934 and was headmaster throughout the war years. Mr H.C. Robinson was the incumbent after Mr Main, serving as headmaster from 1946 until 1960.

At the beginning of the fifties the Transvaal Education Department (TED) decided to separate the boys and girls. In 1951 the girls moved to Lambton, to the building is today occupied by Delville Laerskool.

Miss E.B Bergen was then appointed headmistress, a position she occupied for the rest of the school's thirteen years existence

The Germiston Boys High School, under Mr Robinson, occupied the Lake Grounds building. Mr J. Lane, an old boy of Germiston High, took over the reins of office when Mr Robinson retired in 1960, and held this position until the end of 1963, when he left to take up the position of Headmaster of Greenside High.

Sport
Germiston High School provides rugby, soccer, tennis, netball, basketball, chess, athletics and swimming matches which they participate with other schools in Ekurhuleni

Rugby
Under the administration of Golden Rugby Union, Germiston High have been known as the best team in the league. Their winning record is indomitable and they have been invited to many rugby tournaments in South Africa.

School Subjects
The school offers the following subjects:
English
Mathematics and Mathematical Literacy
Zulu language
Afrikaans
Economic Management Science
Creative Arts
Life Orientation
PAT
Technology
Natural Sciences

Notable alumni
Sydney Brenner, winner of a Nobel Prize in Physiology or Medicine

Academics
In November 2018 several Germiston High School students were invited to the Gauteng Province Mathematical Olympiad. These Germistonians received prizes for their results.

References

External links
 

1902 establishments in South Africa
Educational institutions established in 1902
Girls' schools in South Africa
Schools in Germiston